The Ruger SR22 or SR22P is a compact semi-automatic pistol manufactured by Sturm, Ruger & Co., chambered for the .22 Long Rifle rimfire cartridge.  The SR22 is mainly targeted at plinking and competition shooting.

Design
The SR22 does not share design and ergonomic commonalities with the striker-fired centerfire Ruger SR-Series pistols and mechanically deviates significantly.  In fact, it is more similar to the Walther P22 than a Ruger SR-Series pistol.  The SR22 comes only in compact size, although recently a  barrel version (Model 3620) was released.

The SR22 has a straight blowback-type action, and features a stainless steel barrel that is fixed to the frame.  Furthermore, the SR22 features a double-action/single-action trigger system with a rounded-spur external hammer, and has a visual inspection port in the form of a hole in the top of the slide and the back of the barrel that functions as a loaded chamber indicator.  The pistol is very lightweight thanks to its aluminium slide and polymer frame, and also comes with interchangeable rubber grips for different-sized hands.  The SR22 started to ship in January 2012 and is shipped with two single-stack 10-round magazines and replaceable grips for small or large hands.

The Ruger SR22 is equipped standard with an ambidextrous thumb safety/decocking lever, and magazine release.  Two interchangeable handgrips are offered.  One in slim, and the other in wide-palmswell format.  It is also equipped with a Picatinny rail on the frame below the barrel and in front of the trigger guard.

Models
Note that this list may not include all models.

References

Semi-automatic pistols of the United States
Ruger semi-automatic pistols
.22 LR pistols
Weapons and ammunition introduced in 2012